Perigonia stulta is a moth of the  family Sphingidae. It is known from tropical America.

The wingspan is 50–55 mm. Adults are on wing year-round.

References

Perigonia
Moths described in 1854